Class 16 may refer to:
British Rail Class 16
DRG Class 16, a class of German six-coupled, express train, steam locomotives operated by the Deutsche Reichsbahn which included the:
 Class 16.0: the Oldenburg S 10
 Class 16.0II: the BBÖ 310, PKP Class Pn12 and PKP Class Pn11